The 1994 Winter Olympics, officially known as the XVII Olympic Winter Games and commonly known as Lillehammer '94, was an international winter multi-sport event held from 12 to 27 February 1994 in and around Lillehammer, Norway. Having lost the bid for the 1992 Winter Olympics to Albertville in France, Lillehammer was awarded the 1994 Winter Games on 15 September 1988, at the 94th IOC Session in Seoul, South Korea. This was the only Winter Olympics to take place two years after the previous edition of the Winter Games, and the first to be held in a different year from the Summer Olympics. This was the second Winter Games hosted in Norway — the first being the 1952 Winter Olympics in Oslo — and the fourth Olympics overall to be held in a Nordic country, after the 1912 Summer Olympics in Stockholm, Sweden, and the 1952 Summer Olympics in Helsinki, Finland. Lillehammer is the northernmost city ever to host the Olympic Games. This was the last of three consecutive Olympics held in Europe, with Albertville and Barcelona in Spain hosting the 1992 Winter and Summer Games, respectively.

Although many of the events took place in Lillehammer, the skating events were held in Hamar, some ice hockey matches were played in Gjøvik, and the Alpine skiing events were held in Øyer and Ringebu. Sixty-seven National Olympic Committees and 1,737 athletes participated in six sports and sixty-one events. Fourteen countries made their Winter Olympic debuts, of which nine were former Soviet republics. The Games also saw the introduction of stricter qualifying rules, reducing the number of under-performing participants from warm-weather countries. New events were two new distances in short track speed skating and aerials, while speed skating was moved indoors. Almost two million people spectated at the Games, which were the first to have the Olympic Truce in effect. The Olympics were succeeded by the 1994 Winter Paralympics from 10 to 19 March.

Manuela Di Centa and Lyubov Yegorova dominated women's cross-country skiing, taking five and four medals for Italy and Russia respectively. A crowd of more than 100,000 saw Italy beat Norway by 0.4 seconds in the men's 4 × 10 km relay. Vreni Schneider won a complete set of medals for Switzerland in Alpine skiing, while Norway took a podium sweep in the men's combined competition. Figure skater Nancy Kerrigan won silver in ladies' singles, despite being attacked a few weeks before the Games by Tonya Harding's associate Shane Stant; 16-year-old Oksana Baiul edged Kerrigan to win the gold medal, marking the first time the Ukrainian national anthem was played at the Olympics. Johann Olav Koss won three speed skating golds for Norway, while 13-year-old Kim Yun-mi from South Korea became the youngest-ever Olympic gold medalist. Sweden defeated Canada in a dramatic penalty shootout in the ice hockey final. Russia won the most events, with 11 gold medals, while Norway collected the highest number of medals overall, winning 26.

Host city selection

The idea for an Olympic bid for Norway was born in 1981, when neighboring Fålun,in Sweden was defeated by Calgary in Canada to host the 1988 Winter Olympics.Along the  norwegian government the bid was also publicly encouraged and supported by the Swedish government, largely to help stimulate the economy of their inland counties. Lillehammer originally bid for the 1992 Games but came fourth in the voting, with the Games ultimately awarded to Albertville, France. In 1985, the International Olympic Committee (IOC) voted to separate the Summer and Winter Games (which had been held in the same year since the inception of the Winter Olympics in 1924) and arrange for them to take place in alternating even-numbered years. Lillehammer subsequently launched another bid, now for the 1994 Games, with some drastic modifications of the project, such as a new indoor speed skating venue and an additional ice hall in Lillehammer. Supplementary government guarantees and funds were secured for the new bid.

Three other locations put in bids for the 1994 Games: Anchorage (United States), Östersund (Sweden), and Sofia (Bulgaria). Lillehammer was elected to host the 1994 Winter Games at the 94th IOC Session, held in Seoul on 15 September 1988, two days before the start of the 1988 Summer Olympics. Until 2018, the Lillehammer Games were the last Winter Olympics to be held in a town, rather than centered in a city.

Organization

The overall responsibility for the games was held by the Lillehammer Olympic Organizing Committee, which was created on 14 November 1988 and led by Gerhard Heiberg. It was reorganized several times with various subsidiaries, but from 1993 consisted of a single company owned 51% by Lillehammer Municipality, 24.5% by the Government of Norway and 24.5% by the Norwegian Olympic Committee. The government had issued a guarantee for the games, and also covered the expenses related to infrastructure. The total costs of the games was 7.4 billion Norwegian krone (NOK), of which NOK 0.95 billion was expenditure by the ministries, NOK 4.48 billion was for operations and event expenses, and NOK 1.67 billion was for investments. The games had a revenue of NOK 2.71 billion, of which NOK 1.43 billion was from television rights, NOK 0.65 billion was from sponsors, and NOK 0.15 billion was from ticket sales.

Production of the broadcasting, which costs NOK 462 million, was the joint responsibility of the Norwegian Broadcasting Corporation (NRK),the CTV (Canada) (CTV) and the European Broadcasting Union (EBU). NRK had 1,424 people working at the Olympics, while international broadcasters sent an additional 4,050 accredited broadcasting personnel. The transmission rights for the games were held by EBU in Europe, CBS in the United States, NHK in Japan, CTV in Canada, the Asia-Pacific Broadcasting Union, Nine Network in Australia, as well as other broadcasters in other countries. The total transmission rights price was 350 million United States dollars, 310 of which were paid by CBS. In part because of the Harding–Kerrigan affair, the viewership in the United States is still the highest ever for Winter Olympics.

NOK 460 million was used on information technology, with the main system running on an IBM AS/400. 3,500 terminals were in use during the game based on the Info '94 system; it was the first Olympics to have terminals installed abroad. Seiko delivered the time-keeping devices. Telecommunications were delivered by Telenor, including signal transmission. This included a mobile radio network with nine base stations.

Cost and cost overrun
The Oxford Olympics Study established the outturn cost of the Lillehammer 1994 Winter Olympics at US$2.2 billion in 2015-dollars and cost overrun at 277% in real terms. This includes sports-related costs only, that is, (i) operational costs incurred by the organizing committee for the purpose of staging the Games, e.g., expenditures for technology, transportation, workforce, administration, security, catering, ceremonies, and medical services, and (ii) direct capital costs incurred by the host city and country or private investors to build, e.g., the competition venues, the Olympic village, international broadcast center, and media and press center, which are required to host the Games. Indirect capital costs are not included, such as for road, rail, or airport infrastructure, or for hotel upgrades or other business investment incurred in preparation for the Games but not directly related to staging the Games. The cost and cost overrun for Lillehammer 1994 compares with costs of US$2.5 billion and a cost overrun of 13% for Vancouver 2010, and costs of US$51 billion and a cost overrun of 289% for Sochi 2014, the latter being the most costly Olympics to date. Average cost for Winter Games since 1960 is US$3.1 billion, average cost overrun is 142%.

Events

There were 61 events contested in 6 sports (12 disciplines).

Opening ceremony

The opening ceremony was held at the ski jumping hill Lysgårdsbakken. Artistic content was made to present a range of Norwegian culture, included Sami joik, Telemark skiing, fiddlers and folk dancing, simulations of traditional events and their processions, and the figure of vetter from Norse mythology. After speeches by Heiberg and IOC president Juan Antonio Samaranch, the games were officially declared opened by King Harald V. The Olympic Flame was to be skied down the skijump before lighting the cauldron. Originally this task had rested upon Ole Gunnar Fidjestøl, but after he was injured in a practice jump, his back-up Stein Gruben received the honor.The cauldron was lit by Crown Prince Haakon Magnus. The Olympic oaths were issued by Vegard Ulvang for the athletes and Kari Kåring for the officials.

Alpine skiing

Since the 1992 Games, the rules for combined changed, where the winner was determined by total time instead of points. The women's downhill was originally scheduled for Hafjell, but after protests it was moved to Kvitfjell, which also hosted the men's downhill and super-G. In the men's events, Germany's Markus Wasmeier won two disciplines, giant slalom and super-G, finishing ahead of the United States's Tommy Moe on the super-G. Moe won the downhill ahead of Norway's Kjetil André Aamodt, who came in third in the super-G. Austria's Thomas Stangassinger won the slalom ahead of Italy's Alberto Tomba. In the combined, Norway took a medal sweep, with Lasse Kjus winning ahead of Aamodt and Harald Christian Strand Nilsen.

In the women's events, Switzerland's Vreni Schneider was the most successful, winning the slalom, taking silver in combined and taking bronze in giant slalom. The only other athlete to take multiple medals was Italy's Isolde Kostner, who took a third place in both downhill and super-G. The downhill was won by Germany's Katja Seizinger, super-G by the United States' Diann Roffe, the giant slalom by Italy's Deborah Compagnoni, and the combined by Sweden's Pernilla Wiberg.

Biathlon

Russia and Germany split all the individual men's medals. In the 10 km sprint, Russia's Sergei Tchepikov won ahead of Ricco Groß, both with a clean sheet. Bronze winner Sergei Tarasov won the 20 km individual ahead of Germany's Frank Luck and Sven Fischer. Germany easily revenged itself by winning the 4 × 7.5 km relay ahead of Russia and France. In the women's class, Canada's Myriam Bédard won both the individual events, finishing ahead of Belarus' Svetlana Paramygina on the 7.5 km sprint and ahead of France's Anne Briand on the 15 km individual. In the 4 × 7.5 km relay, the format since 1992 was changed from three to four participants. Russia, with a clean sheet, won ahead of Germany, who made six misses, with France taking the bronze.

Bobsleigh

In two-man, Switzerland took the top two places, with Gustav Weder, Donat Acklin winning 0.05 seconds ahead of Reto Götschi and Guido Acklin, who were again 0.15 seconds ahead of Italy's Günther Huber and Stefano Ticci placing third. In four-man, Germany-II, consisting of Harald Czudaj, Karsten Brannasch, Olaf Hampel and Alexander Szelig, finished 0.06 seconds ahead of Switzerland-I and 0.23 ahead of Germany-I.

Cross-country skiing

Participants from five countries took all the medals of the ten events. Starting in 1994, the Olympics alternated which of the medium-distance and long-distance races had classical and freestyle. men's 4 × 10 km relay was watched by a crowd of nearly 150,000. Norway, Italy and Finland followed each other tightly for three and a half rounds, with the second and third exchange of the three talking place within 1.1 seconds of each other. Finland fell behind in the end, and Norwegian Bjørn Dæhlie and Italian Silvio Fauner battled to the end, with Italy beating Norway by 0.4 seconds. Dæhlie won the 10 km classical and 15 km freestyle pursuit, while taking silver in the 30 km freestyle. Kazakhstan's Vladimir Smirnov won the 50 km classical, in addition to silver in the 10 km and the 15 km. Norway's Thomas Alsgaard won the 30 km, while Finland's Mika Myllylä took an individual silver and a bronze.

Italy's Manuela Di Centa and Russia's Lyubov Yegorova dominated the women's events. They took five and four medals each, respectively, and between them winning all the races. Yegorova finished ahead of Di Centa on the 5 km classical and the 10 km pursuit, while Di Centa finished ahead of Yegorova on the 15 km freestyle, and also won the 30 km classical ahead of Norway's Marit Wold. Finland's Marja-Liisa Kirvesniemi took two bronze medals, in 5 km and 30 km. In the 4 × 5 km relay, Norway and Russia kept up with each other until the final stage, in which Anita Moen lost to Yegorova, with Italy finishing third. With Yegorova's sixth career gold, she was tied as the most-winning Winter Olympic participant.

Figure skating

On 6 January, Tonya Harding's ex-husband, Jeff Gillooly and his friend Shawn Eckdardt, conspired with Shane Stant to club fellow female figure skater Nancy Kerrigan in the knee. Both Harding and Kerrigan were selected for the Olympic team. After Harding admitted to helping to cover up the attack, the United States Olympic Committee initiated proceedings to remove her from the Olympic team, but Harding retained her place after threatening legal action. In the ladies' singles, Ukraine's Oksana Baiul won ahead of Kerrigan and Chen Lu, with Harding finishing eighth. In the men's singles, Russia's Alexei Urmanov won ahead of Canada's Elvis Stojko and France's Philippe Candeloro. Relaxation of the amateurism rules led to several former stars returning, such as ice dancing 1984 Champions Great Britain's Jayne Torvill and Christopher Dean, who took a bronze behind Russians Oksana Grishuk and Evgeny Platov, and Maya Usova and Alexander Zhulin. In pair skating, the Russians also took a double, with Ekaterina Gordeeva and Sergei Grinkov winning ahead of Natalia Mishkutenok and Artur Dmitriev.

Freestyle skiing

Aerials was added as a discipline, after it had been a demonstration sport at the previous two games. Ski ballet, which had been a demonstration sport in 1992, was dropped. Canada dominated the men's events, with Jean-Luc Brassard winning the men's moguls ahead of Russian Sergey Shupletsov. In the men's aerials, Switzerlands's Andreas Schönbächler won ahead of Canada's Philippe LaRoche and Lloyd Langlois, with Canadians also claiming the fourth and sixth places. In the women's disciplines, Norway was the only nation to take two medals; Stine Lise Hattestad won the moguls ahead of the United States' Liz McIntyre. In the aerials, Lina Cheryazova won, claiming Uzbekistan's only medal, ahead of Sweden's Marie Lindgren and Norway's Hilde Synnøve Lid.

Ice hockey

Twelve teams participated in the ice hockey tournament, divided into two groups. Each played as a single round robin, with the four best advancing to the single elimination medal tournament. Group A saw Finland win all five matches, while the host nation lost all theirs. Also Germany, the Czech Republic and Russia advanced from the group, all with three victories. Group B was won by Slovakia ahead of Canada, Sweden and the United States. The quarter-finals saw the Czech Republic, the United States, Germany and Slovakia eliminated. In the semi-finals, Canada beat Finland 5–3, while Sweden beat Russia 4–3. After the final period of the final, the match was a 2–2 tie, resulting in a shoot-out. After six shots, it was tied 2–2 until Sweden's Peter Forsberg beat Corey Hirsch, making the Swedes win after Paul Kariya missed his shot. This led to Tomas Jonsson, Håkan Loob and Mats Näslund becoming the first three members of the Triple Gold Club.

Luge

Italy, Germany and Austria collected all the medals in the luge events. Germany's Georg Hackl won the men's singles, making him the first to defend an Olympic title in the event in thirty years. He finished ahead of Austria's Markus Prock and Italy's Armin Zöggeler. In the doubles, the two Italian teams finished on top, with Kurt Brugger and Wilfried Huber winning ahead of Hansjörg Raffl and Norbert Huber. In the women's singles, Italy's Gerda Weissensteiner won ahead of Germany's Susi Erdmann and Austria's Andrea Tagwerker. The own debuts was start Nedžad Lomigora from Bosnia and Herzegovina, Marco Feder from Liechtenstein, Sminon J. Payne from Bermuda, Paul Hix from United Kingdom, Josef Svarek from Slovakia, Roger White from Australia.

Nordic combined

Although the events were the same, since the 1992 Games there was a rule change so that instead of jumping three times and taking the points for the best two, the competitors only jumped twice. In the individual normal hill/15 km, Japan's Kenji Ogiwara had only lost a single event in the season's World Cup, but came in sixth on the hill, which was won by Norway's Fred Børre Lundberg. He won the event after finishing eight-best in the skiing, ahead of Japan's Takanori Kono, Norway's Bjarte Engen Vik and Ogiwara in fourth. In the team normal hill/3 x 10 km, Japan finished first, third and fifth among the jumpers, giving them a 5:07 minute lead over Norway and finishing 4:49 minutes ahead. Switzerland took the bronze.

Short track speed skating

Short track speed skating was dominated by South Korea, who won four of the six events. After the discipline's debut in 1992, 1994 featured two new events, the men's 500 meters and the women's 1000 meters. South Korea's Chae Ji-Hoon won the men's 500 meters, while taking silver on the 1000 meters behind countryman Kim Ki-Hoon, who defended his 1992 gold. The bronze was won by Canada's Marc Gagnon, who won the B final. In the A final, countryman Derrick Campbell was obstructed by Great Britain's Nicky Gooch, who was disqualified. Campbell got up and started celebrating his bronze medal, when he discovered he had not completed the race.

In the men's 5000 meter relay, South Korea did not enter after a fall in the sole qualifying event, which took place in March 1993. Canada fell during the final, which saw Italy take a clear victory ahead of the United States, who were marginally ahead of Australia. The United States' Eric Flaim became the first to take Olympic medals in both short track and long track speed skating, while Australia took its first Winter Olympic medal ever. Six people took the individual medals in the women's events, with the United States' Cathy Turner defending her 1992 gold on the 500 meters and South Korea's Chun Lee-Kyung taking the gold in 1000 meters. South Korea won the 3000 meter relay with a team of four girls under 19. At 13, Kim Yoon-Mi became the world's youngest Olympic gold medalist.

Ski jumping

Norway won three of the six individual medals, with Norway's Espen Bredesen winning the normal hill ahead of Norway's Lasse Ottesen and Germany's Dieter Thoma. In the large hill, Germany's Jens Weißflog won ahead of Bredesen and Austria's Andreas Goldberger. In the
large hill team, the 1994 Games introduced new rules whereby all four jumps in each round counted, and not just the best three. Neither Norway nor Finland, who between them had won all but one former Olympic team jump, managed to collect a medal. The event became a duel between Germany and Japan, with only a point separating them after the first round of jumps. Masahiko Harada had the last jump, and would secure a gold if he managed 105 meters but lost his 'cool' mistiming his leap and landed at 97.5 meters, giving the gold to the Germans.

Speed skating

The long track speed skating events moved indoors, after they had been held outdoors in 1992. The 1994 Games introduced new qualification rules, limiting the number of participants in the men's 5000 meters and women's 3000 meters to 32, and only allowing the 16 best in each of these events to participate in the men's 10000 meters and the women's 5000 meters. Norway's Johann Olav Koss took three golds, in the men's 1,500 meters, 5000 meters and 10000 meters. In the latter two, he finished ahead of fellow countryman Kjell Storelid. The men's 500 meters was won by Russia's Aleksandr Golubev ahead of fellow countryman Sergey Klevchenya, while the men's 1000 meters was won by American Dan Jansen. For women, American Bonnie Blair defended her two 1992 golds in 500 meters and 1000 meters. Austria's Emese Hunyady won the 1500 meters ahead of Russia's Svetlana Bazhanova and Germany's Gunda Niemann. However, Bazhanova took gold ahead of Nemeth-Hunyady on the 3000 meters, with Germany's Claudia Pechstein in third. Pechstein would go on to win the 5000 meters ahead of Niemann.

Closing ceremony

At the closing ceremonies, also held at Lysgårdsbakken, all spectators were handed a flashlight with the inscription "Remember Sarajevo"—the host of the 1984 Winter Olympics which was at worst moment of the Yugoslavian Civil War,the Siege of Sarajevo . The first entrants on the stage were Liv Ullmann and Thor Heyerdahl, followed by the athletes' precession. After the Olympic flag had been transferred to Nagano mayor Tasuka Tsukada, speeches were held by Lillehammer mayor Audun Tron, Heiberg and Samaranch. The latter used his speech to remind about Sarajevo's situation, before giving Heiberg IOC's gold medal. Artistic presentations followed with many of the themes from the opening ceremony.At the 15-minute presentation as the next host city,Nagano was presented to world as  a modern Yama-uba,also the 1998 Winter Olympics mascots, the Snowlets, was also presented on a public eye for the first time. Of the 2,200 people performing in the opening and closing ceremonies, only 50 were professionals.

Paralympics

The VI Winter Paralympics were run in part by a different Organizing Committee (LPOC), but the LOOC managed all the common areas of the two events, serving as a model for Sydney that would host the 2000 Summer Paralympics, six years later. The Games were held  from 10 to 19 March. Competitions were held in Alpine skiing, ice sledge speed racing, biathlon and cross-country skiing; the games also introduced ice sledge hockey. The Paralympics used the same venues as the Olympics, and were the second in Norway, after the 1980 Winter Paralympics in Geilo. 471 athletes from 31 countries participated, with Norway claiming the most gold medals ahead of Germany. This was the first Paralympics which the International Paralympic Committee had 100% involvement and responsibility. They featured their own logo (the people under the sun), the amputee mascot Sondre. However, the Paralympics despite being organized by an Organizing Committee in a different composition, had the same visual identity and was treated as an integral part of the event.

Venues

The games were spread out over ten venues in five municipalities in two counties, Oppland and Hedmark. Lillehammer, with 25,000 inhabitants, and Hamar and Gjøvik, both with 27,000 inhabitants, are all situated on the lake Mjøsa. Lillehammer had four venues, Hamar had two venues, while Hunderfossen, Gjøvik, Øyer and Ringebu had one venue each.

In Lillehammer, Lysgårdsbakken features twin ski jumping hills. The large hill has a hill size of 138 and a critical point of 120, while the normal hill has a hill size of 100 and a critical point of 90. The hill has capacity for 35,000 spectators and hosted, in addition to the ski jumping events, the opening and closing ceremonies. Birkebeineren Skistadion featured cross-country skiing and biathlon, with the stadium itself having a capacity for 31,000 spectators during cross-country skiing and 13,500 during biathlon. In addition, spectators could watch from along the tracks. Kanthugen Freestyle Arena featured a capacity for 15,000 spectators. All the outdoor skiing arenas had free areas, which saw up to 25,000 extra spectators at the team jump and 75,000 extra spectators at the 50 km.

Lillehammer Olympic Bobsleigh and Luge Track is located at Hunderfossen. It had a capacity for 10,000 spectators and is the only bobsleigh and luge track in the Nordic countries. Ice hockey was played at two venues, in Håkons Hall in Lillehammer and Gjøvik Olympic Cavern Hall in Gjøvik. Håkons Hall has a capacity for 10,500 spectators, and also features the Norwegian Olympic Museum. The Cavern Hall is built as a man-made cave and had a capacity for 5,300 spectators. Skating events took place at two venues in Hamar. Vikingskipet had a capacity for 10,600 spectators and featured speed skating events, while figure skating and short-track speed skating were held at Hamar Olympic Amphitheatre. Alpine skiing was split between two ski resorts: Hafjell in Øyer and Kvitfjell in Ringebu. The former was used for the slalom and giant slalom, while the latter hosted downhill and super-G.

Spectators relied heavily on the use of buses and trains for transportation. Downtown Lillehammer and the axis between Lillehammer and Oslo were the most limiting areas, and the Norwegian State Railways ran up to 22 trains per day between Oslo and Lillehammer. Trains were also used northwards towards Trondheim, while other areas were served by bus. All the venues were located along railway lines, making use of spectators walking from the stations to the venues to limit road congestion, although special services were available for disabled people. Shuttle buses were established between venues and also connected to park and ride facilities.

Participating National Olympic Committees

A record 67 nations participated in the 1994 Winter Olympics. These Games were the first to implement stricter qualifying standards that prevented low-performing athletes from competing without meeting minimum requirements. As a consequence, eleven "warm-weather countries" that signed up to take part in the Games were mostly absent because very few of their athletes succeeded in qualifying; the number of African athletes fell from nineteen in 1992 to three in 1994. These rules were, however, not applied to bobsled events, enabling the U.S. Virgin Islands, Trinidad and Tobago and Jamaica to compete in that sport. On 25 October 1993, the United Nations General Assembly urged its members to observe the Olympic truce, lasting from seven days before the start of the Games until seven days after the close, making the Lillehammer Olympics the first to observe the truce. The IOC appealed for a truce in the ongoing Bosnian War and the Siege of Sarajevo, the city that had hosted the 1984 Winter Olympics.

The former Soviet republics of Armenia, Belarus, Georgia, Kazakhstan, Kyrgyzstan, Moldova, Ukraine and Uzbekistan participated as independent nations. This was the first time since the 1912 Summer Olympics that Russia competed independently at the Olympic Games. Athletes of these countries previously competed in the Winter Olympics as part of the Soviet Union team until 1991. The Czech Republic and Slovakia participated for the first time, after the break-up of Czechoslovakia in 1993. Bosnia and Herzegovina made their Olympic debut, following their independence from Yugoslavia in 1992; the composition of their four-man bob team was one Croat, two Bosniaks and a Serb, mirroring the ethnic diversity of the country. This was also Israel's first appearance at the Winter Olympics and a member of the European Olympic Committees. American Samoa participated for the first time, as did Trinidad and Tobago.

Calendar
All dates are in Central European Time (UTC+1)

Medal table 

Russia won the most golds, while Norway won the most medals overall. The following table presents the top ten nations, sorted by gold medals, with the host nation highlighted.

Podium sweeps

Notes

References

External links 

 
 
 The program of the 1994 Lillehammer Winter Olympics
 
 
 
 
 

 
Winter Olympics, 1994
Olympic Games in Norway
Winter Olympics, 1994
Winter Olympics by year
Sport in Lillehammer
Winter multi-sport events in Norway
February 1994 sports events in Europe